Might Is Right or The Survival of the Fittest is a book by pseudonymous author Ragnar Redbeard, generally believed to be a pen name of Arthur Desmond. First published in 1896, it advocates amorality, consequentialism and psychological hedonism.

Content 
The author sums up his work as follows:

In Might Is Right, Redbeard rejects conventional ideas such as advocacy of human and natural rights and argues in addition that only strength or physical might can establish moral right (à la Callicles or Thrasymachus). The book also attacks Christianity and democracy. Friedrich Nietzsche's theories of master–slave morality and herd mentality served as inspirations for Redbeard's book which was written contemporaneously.

James J. Martin, the individualist anarchist historian, called it "surely one of the most incendiary works ever to be published anywhere." This refers to the book's assertions that weakness should be regarded with hatred and the strong and forceful presence of Social Darwinism. Other parts of the book deal with the topics of race and male–female relations. The book claims that the woman and the family as a whole are the property of the man, and it proclaims that the Anglo-Saxon race is innately superior to all other races. The book also contains anti-Christian and anti-Semitic statements.

Authorship 
S. E. Parker writes in his introduction to the text: "The most likely candidate is a man named Arthur Desmond who was red-bearded, red-haired and whose poetry was very similar to that written by Redbeard." The Bulletin, a journal associated with the Australian labour movement, reported in July 1900 that Desmond (a former contributor to the publication) was Ragnar Redbeard.

The Church of Satan founder Anton LaVey and white supremacist publisher Katja Lane (wife of The Order member David Lane) both believed novelist Jack London was substantially involved, if not the author of the entire book; the latter based her judgment on London's distinctive grammar and punctuation. However, this idea was rejected by Rodger Jacobs, a biographer of London, since London was only 20 years old at the time and had not yet developed that writing style, nor had he read anything by Nietzsche.

Response
Leo Tolstoy, whom Might Is Right described as "the ablest modern expounder of primitive Christliness", responded in his 1897 essay What Is Art?:

S. E. Parker wrote: "Might Is Right is a work flawed by major contradictions." In particular, he criticized the inconsistency of the book's central dogma of individualism with its open sexism and racism (both requiring a membership in a collective). However, he concluded that "it is sustained by a crude vigor that at its most coherent can help to clear away not a few of the religious, moral and political superstitions bequeathed to us by our ancestors."

Author Chris Mathews suspects that the work is at least partly intended to be a satire of Social Darwinism, and he also characterizes it as a "proto-fascist white power manifesto".

Influence
Portions of Might Is Right comprise the vast majority of The Book of Satan in Anton LaVey's 1969 The Satanic Bible, the founding document of the Church of Satan. Though it is no longer included in current printings of The Satanic Bible, early printings included an extensive dedication to various people whom LaVey recognized as influences, including Ragnar Redbeard.

Santino William Legan, the perpetrator of the 2019 Gilroy Garlic Festival shooting in Gilroy, California, mentioned Might is Right in an Instagram post. The work is regularly cited by white supremacist groups online.

Editions

References

External links

Might Is Right text
"Hypocrisy, Plagiarism and LaVey," by John Smith, contains comparisons of quotations from Might Is Right with similar quotations from The Satanic Bible
Might Is Right Audiobook Audiobook from Zem Books

1896 non-fiction books
Antisemitic publications
Books critical of Christianity
Philosophy books
Books involved in plagiarism controversies
Works of unknown authorship
Works published under a pseudonym